Brzózki may refer to the following places:
Brzózki, Kuyavian-Pomeranian Voivodeship (north-central Poland)
Brzózki, Łódź Voivodeship (central Poland)
Brzózki, Podlaskie Voivodeship (north-east Poland)
Brzózki, Greater Poland Voivodeship (west-central Poland)
Brzózki, Gmina Lipie in Silesian Voivodeship (south Poland)
Brzózki, Gmina Popów in Silesian Voivodeship (south Poland)
Brzózki, Pomeranian Voivodeship (north Poland)
Brzózki, Warmian-Masurian Voivodeship (north Poland)
Brzózki, West Pomeranian Voivodeship (north-west Poland)